The All-WNBL Team is an annual Women's National Basketball League (WNBL) honour bestowed on the best performing players in the league following every WNBL season. From 1988 to 2018–19, the honour was known as the All-Star Five. As of 2020, it is awarded in two teams to the ten most outstanding players in the league.

Honourees

1988 to 2019

2019 to present 

 The MVP of each season is highlighted in bold text.

Most selections 

 The table above only lists players with at least three total selections.

See also
 WNBL Most Valuable Player Award
 WNBL Defensive Player of the Year Award
 All-NBL Team
 All-WNBA Team
 List of Australian WNBA players
 Australia women's national basketball team

References

Women's National Basketball League awards